John Denis Sargan, FBA (23 August 1924 – 13 April 1996) was a British econometrician who specialized in the analysis of economic time-series.
 
Sargan was born in Doncaster, Yorkshire in 1924, and was educated at Doncaster Grammar School and St John's College, Cambridge. He made many contributions, notably in instrumental variables estimation, Edgeworth expansions for the distributions of econometric estimators, identification conditions in simultaneous equations models, asymptotic tests for overidentifying restrictions in homoskedastic equations and exact tests for unit roots in autoregressive and moving average models.  At the LSE, Sargan was Professor of Econometrics from 1964–1984. Sargan was President of the Econometric Society, a Fellow of the British Academy  and an (honorary foreign) member of the American Academy of Arts and Sciences.

His influence on econometric methodology is evident in several fields including in the development of Generalized Method of Moments estimators.

Selected publications 
 
 Sargan, J. D. (1964). "Wages and Prices in the United Kingdom: A Study in Econometric Methodology", 16, 25–54. in Econometric Analysis for National Economic Planning, ed. by P. E. Hart, G. Mills, and J. N. Whittaker. London: Butterworths
 

Published posthumously
 Sargan, J. D. (2001). "The Choice Between Sets of Regressors." Econometric Reviews 20(2).
 Sargan, J. D. (2001). "Model Building and Data Mining." Econometric Reviews 20(2): 159-170.
 Sargan, J. D. (2003). "The Development of Econometrics at LSE in the Last 30 Years." Econometric Theory 19(3): 429-438.

References

Further reading

External links 
 

1924 births
1996 deaths
Alumni of St John's College, Cambridge
Fellows of the Econometric Society
Presidents of the Econometric Society
Fellows of the British Academy
Academics of the London School of Economics
English statisticians
20th-century English mathematicians
20th-century British economists
People from Doncaster